Sazeman-e Seyd Ahmad Khomeyni (also Romanized as Sāzemān-e Seyd Aḩmad Khomeynī; also known as Seyyedaḩmad-e Khomeynī) is a village in Daland Rural District, in the Central District of Ramian County, Golestan Province, Iran. At the 2006 census, its population was 245, in 64 families.

References 

Populated places in Ramian County